Wansbeck District Council elections were generally held every four years between the council's creation in 1974 and its abolition in 2009. Wansbeck District was a non-metropolitan district in Northumberland, England. The council was abolished and its functions transferred to Northumberland County Council with effect from 1 April 2009.

Political control
The first election to the council was held in 1973, initially operating as a shadow authority before coming into its powers on 1 April 1974. From 1973 until its abolition in 2009 political control of the council was held by the following parties:

Council elections
1973 Wansbeck District Council election
1976 Wansbeck District Council election (New ward boundaries)
1979 Wansbeck District Council election
1983 Wansbeck District Council election
1987 Wansbeck District Council election
1991 Wansbeck District Council election
1995 Wansbeck District Council election
1999 Wansbeck District Council election (New ward boundaries)
2003 Wansbeck District Council election
2007 Wansbeck District Council election (New ward boundaries)

By-election results

References

 
Council elections in Northumberland
District council elections in England